John Morgan is an American mixed martial arts writer, radio host and television commentator.

Biography
Morgan was the lead staff reporter and co-owner of MMAjunkie.com (a content partner site of Yahoo! Sports) and has been covering MMA professionally since 2007.

He is co-host of "MMAjunkie.com Radio," which is simulcast on television as "MMAjunkie.com Radio Live" on the upstart Fight Now! TV cable channel. The channel is available on Cablevision in the Northeast U.S.

He is also a featured columnist for "Fighters Only" magazine and a frequent contributor to "UFC Magazine", and he previously covered MMA for the "Dallas Morning News."

In addition to his writing work, he's commentated MMA events online and for television for the Tachi Palace Fights, MMA Xplosion, Tuff-N-Uff and Superior Cage Combat organizations. He also occasionally co-hosts "MMA:30 Radio" on Las Vegas' KXNT Radio 100.5 FM/840 AM.

Morgan routinely is the first journalist to begin UFC press conferences.

Awards
Morgan was awarded MMA Journalist of the Year at the World MMA Awards 2009. He was nominated for the award again in 2010, 2011, 2012, 2013, 2014, 2015, 2016, 2017, 2018 and 2019 but ultimately lost to Ariel Helwani every time.

As the outlet's lead staff reporter, he also helped lead MMAjunkie.com to MMA Media Outlet of the Year victories at the World MMA Awards in 2008, 2009, 2010 and 2011.

References

External links
 MMAjunkie.com

Living people
Mixed martial arts journalists
People from Dallas
Year of birth missing (living people)